Charles Herbert Jenkins (born 17 June 1878) was an Australian rules footballer who played with Fitzroy in the Victorian Football League.

Sources

External links

 

Australian rules footballers from Melbourne
Fitzroy Football Club players
1878 births
Year of death missing
People from Carlton, Victoria